Red Bull 400 is a world series founded by Red Bull in 2011, the most extreme and steepest global 400 m uphill sprint. Competitors from all over the world run from the bottom to the top of ski jumping and ski flying hills, beating the total distance of 400 metres (1312 ft) with max incline angle of 37 degrees (75%).

Nineteen different countries hosted Red Bull 400 races so far: Austria, Bosnia and Herzegovina, Slovenia, Finland, Czech Republic, Canada, Germany, United States, Kazakhstan, Turkey, Japan, Russia, Norway, France, Italy, Poland, Slovakia, Switzerland and South Korea.

Global map of all Red Bull 400 hosts 
All 25 locations around the globe hosting events in seventeen different countries:

 new hosts in 2019

Events

Men

Women

References

External links 

Official website redbull400.com

Sprint (running)
Athletics (track and field) competitions
Red Bull sports events
Recurring sporting events established in 2011
Novelty running